Gila may refer to:

Animals 
 Gila (fish), a genus of cyprinid fish known as western chubs
 Gila monster, a venomous lizard
 Gila trout, a trout native to the Southwestern United States
 Gila woodpecker, a species of woodpecker found in the Southwestern United States

Places 
 Gila County, Arizona
 Gila Mountains (Graham County), Arizona
 Gila Mountains (Yuma County), Arizona
 Gila River, a Colorado River tributary in New Mexico and Arizona
 Gila, New Mexico, a census-designated place
 Gila National Forest, New Mexico
 Gila Wilderness, New Mexico, the world's first wilderness area
 Gila Desert, the informal name of Sonoran Desert, United States and Mexico

People 
 Gila (given name), a list of people
 Eloy Gila (born 1988), Spanish footballer
 Miguel Gila (1919–2001), Spanish actor
 Nickname of Alberto Gilardino (born 1982), Italian football manager and former player
 Gila (footballer), Portuguese football player and coach Virgílio José Pereira do Nascimento (born 1967)

Music
 Gila (band), a German krautrock band
 Gila (album)
 "Gila", a song by dream pop band Beach House

Other uses
 Gila (sternwheeler), a stern-wheel steamboat
 Gila (TV series), a Pakistani romantic television serial
 Gila APC, a South African-designed armoured personnel carrier
 Gila MBPV, a mine protected vehicle from South Africa
 Gila Community College, Gila County, Arizona
 Gila Preparatory Academy, Safford, Arizona, a high school
 A Portuguese name for the fruit of the Cucurbita ficifolia, a species of squash

See also
 Gila City, Arizona, a ghost town
 Gilla (disambiguation)
 Gilas, Iran, a village